Collarbone is a rock band from Helsinki, Finland, founded in 2000. Influences from alternative rock and hard rock can be heard in the group's music. The band has released two full-length albums.

Background

The beginning
The four founding members, Thomas Kirjonen, Janne Suominen, Matti Piipponen and Janne Sivunen formed the band in late 2000. The band made three demo recordings and an EP called "Devil in Miss Verril", which was released in 2004. The band signed a record deal with Spinefarm Records after winning Ääni ja Vimma (Sound and Fury), a major Finnish band contest, in 2005.

The Back of Beyond
The band's debut album, The Back of Beyond, was released in March 2007. It was produced by Jonas Olsson, mixed by Jens Bogren and mastered by Ue Nastasi in Sterling Sound, New York City. The single "The Last Call" was played on Finland's Radio Rock, and was included on the soundtrack of the TV show Äijät on Finnish SubTV.

Pretty Dirty
In late 2008 the band added to its lineup guitarist Mikko Merilinna, notable for his work in the Finnish metal band April. Collarbone's second album, Pretty Dirty, was recorded in summer 2009, Jonas Olsson again being the producer. Risto Hemmi mixed the record in January 2010 in Finnvox Studios, Helsinki.

The first single from the new album, The Machine, was released in March 2010. The record was released via Universal Music in April 2010.

Lineup 
 Thomas Kirjonen – vocals (2000–2011)
 Janne Suominen – guitar (2000–)
 Mikko Merilinna – guitar (2008–)
 Matti Piipponen – bass guitar (2000–)
 Janne Sivunen – drums (2000–)

Discography

Albums 
 The Back of Beyond (2007)
 Pretty Dirty (2010)

Singles 
 The Last Call (2007)
 The Machine (2005)

Music videos 
 Gone (2004)
 The Last Call (2007)
 The Machine (2010)
 The End of The Line (2010)

References

External links 
 Official site
 Collarbone at MySpace.com

Finnish alternative rock groups
Finnish hard rock musical groups
Musical groups established in 2000